Greenmont Historic District is a national historic district located at Morgantown, Monongalia County, West Virginia. The district includes 409 contributing buildings, 4 contributing structures, and 2 contributing objects in a primarily residential area of the Greenmount neighborhood of Morgantown.  Most of the dwellings were built between 1901 and 1925 and are of frame construction with brick or wood facades, one- to  stories high with gable fronts. Notable buildings include the Reformation Orthodox Presbyterian Church.  Also in the district are the separately listed Kern's Fort, and Hackney House.

It was listed on the National Register of Historic Places in 2005.

References

Houses on the National Register of Historic Places in West Virginia
Historic districts on the National Register of Historic Places in West Virginia
Colonial architecture in West Virginia
Georgian architecture in West Virginia
Historic districts in Monongalia County, West Virginia
Houses in Morgantown, West Virginia
National Register of Historic Places in Monongalia County, West Virginia